Lionel Oldfield Johnston (21 December 1926 – 12 May 2005) was an Australian rules footballer who played with Hawthorn in the Victorian Football League (VFL).

Notes

External links 

Lionel Johnston's playing statistics from The VFA Project

1926 births
2005 deaths
Australian rules footballers from Melbourne
Hawthorn Football Club players
Oakleigh Football Club players
People from Burwood, Victoria